Adamsville is an unincorporated community in Lampasas County, Texas, United States. According to the Handbook of Texas, the community had a population of 41 in 2000. It is located within the Killeen-Temple-Fort Hood metropolitan area.

History
The area in what is known as Adamsville today was established around 1856. Joseph Leland Straley built one of the first houses in the area. Jasper and Perry Townsen also settled here. In the 1870s, the community hosted several cattle drives that were driven short distances to join larger cattle trails to the north. One of the Townsen brothers, Jasper, built a mill on Mill Branch near the intersection of the Lampasas River and Mill Branch, about two miles southeast of Adamsville. The mill originally sent cut lumber from Round Rock, but another mill that was used for wheat and corn was built. Both served the entire county. McCall Smith opened one of the first stores in the community and was also operated by a Presbyterian minister and a man named John Adams. Another store was located near the mills. A post office was established at Adamsville in 1876 in that store and was named Townsen Mills for Perry Townsen, the first postmaster. When people were surveying the land along Simms Creek in the 1870s, several Native American attacks occurred while they were working. A Cumberland Presbyterian church was the first church built in Adamsville in 1881. Perry Townsen died in an accident on New Year's Day, 1891. Jasper then asked for the post office to be relocated and was transferred to the other store in Adamsville. It was named after John Adams, who owned the store during that time. Jasper Townsen then sold the mill, which was transferred to Hamilton County. Several other mills were operating here as well. There were two churches, several stores, a cafe, and a locker plant in Adamsville in 1974. Its population ranged from 75 to 100 from the mid-1880s to the early-1930s. It dropped to 10 in 1933 but rose again in 1941. It went up from 150 to 200 in 1961 but declined again to 28 from 1972 through 1990. Its population rose to 41 in 2000. The population went up to 45 in 2010.

The John Patterson House in the community is on the National Register of Historic Places.

Geography

Climate
The climate in this area is characterized by hot, humid summers and generally mild to cool winters. According to the Köppen Climate Classification system, Adamsville has a humid subtropical climate, abbreviated "Cfa" on climate maps.

Education
Straley's School was the first school built in Adamsville in 1885 and also served as a church for Baptist and Presbyterian congregations. Another school was built in 1918 and burned to the ground on March 27, 1942. A school in nearby Mount View was moved to Adamsville sometime after World War II. Today the community is served by the Lampasas Independent School District, with elementary-age kids going to Hanna Springs Elementary School.

References 

Unincorporated communities in Lampasas County, Texas
Unincorporated communities in Texas